Choe Chung-heon (1149 – 29 October 1219) was a military ruler of Korea during the Goryeo period.

Choe's father was a Supreme General in the Goryeo military, hence precipitating his own entry into the military. Choe witnessed military men become all-powerful in the quick succession of military leaders who deposed one another.

Choe plotted against the long-standing Council of Generals (Jungbang), feigning fealty to the newly promoted supreme general and council head, a slave's son, Yi Ui-min. After many years of humiliation and hardship, Choe and his subordinates launched a coup d'état while Yi was away. After destroying the Council of Generals and killing Yi, he became a prominent leader. Choe established a new military-style regime that he did not have full power over but was eventually successful.

Although the coup was a success, Choe did not take full power.  Choe became Prime Minister of the State and Royal Protector, seeing the abdication of 4 kings (asked for 2 of the 4), 3 rebellions, and numerous attempts on his life. Finally, during the early reign of King Gojong, Choe retired, handing his position to his eldest son Choe U (though not without bloodshed as his youngest attempted to take it for himself). Choe Chungheon died of age at 71 in 1219.

Until the death of Choe's grandsons, the Choe family reigned supreme over the political and military landscape of Goryeo. Choe U, Choe Hang, and Choe Ui passed the legacy of Choe Chung-heon for sixty years until the assassination of Choe Ui.

Early life 
Choe Chung-heon was born in 1149, the son of Supreme General Choe Won-ho (최원호) and his wife, Lady Yu (유씨). He is thought to have been born in Gaeseong or Gyeongju. He was descended from the famous Confucian scholar Choe Chi-won, who lived in the North South States Period and was the ancestor of the Gyeongju Choe clan, but because Choe Won-ho was given the bon-gwan of Ubong, his family split from the Gyeongju Choe clan and became the Ubong Choe clan. He married Lady Song, the daughter of general Song Cheol, and had two sons by her, Choe U and Choe Hyang.

Rise to power 
Choe entered the military, like his father, and was a colonel until he reached age 35, when he became a general. He joined the Council of Generals at age 40. Choe served under the military dictators during the reign of King Myeongjong. During the rule of military dictator Yi Ui-min, Choe and his brother Choe Chung-su became unsatisfied with his reign. One of Yi's sons, Yi Ji-yeong, seized Chung-su's chickens. When Chung-su confronted the thief, he was tied up instead.The angered Chung-su then plotted with his brother, Chung-heon, to overthrow Yi Ui-min's regime. In 1196, Chung-heon and his brother assassinated Yi while he was visiting a mountain pavilion. The brothers then raced for the capital and managed to convince General Baek Jon-yu (백존유;白存儒), a military officer in the capital to support his cause. Choe was also able to gain the approval of Myeongjong for his killing of Yi. With government forces, the Choes were able to defeat the armies of the Yi loyalists. In 1197, Choe then replaced the weak Myeongjong with King Sinjong, Myeongjong's younger brother.

Dictator 
Chung-heon started to reorganize the government, but Chung-su unseated the Crown Princess and tried to marry his daughter to the Crown Prince. Choe Chung-heon immediately intervened and a bloody struggle between the Choe brothers ensued. In the end, Chung-su lost and was beheaded by Choe Chung-heon's troops. Choe Chung-Heon was said to have wept when he saw his brother's head and gave a proper burial.

Choe established a government where he can work with both ministers and military officials to stabilize his regime. He also appointed several of his relatives to high government positions to slowly expand his power. King Sinjong fell ill in 1204 and secretly begged Choe to preserve the kingdom and not overthrow it. Choe respected this last request from the king and gave the throne to Sinjong's son who became King Huijong. Sinjong died of disease immediately thereafter.

Huijong was determined to retrieve all the former powers that military dictators and usurpers had taken from the kings, including by removing Choe. Choe had been given the ranks of Prime Minister of the State, and Royal Protector, with power equivalent to the kings.

Rebellions
Soon, two rebellions struck at once. One was led by Pak Jin-jae, Choe's nephew, and the other was a movement to resurrect Silla. Both rebellions were destroyed by Choe. This was followed by the Slave rebellion, led by one of Choe's own slaves, Manjeok (만적). The slaves killed their masters and gathered on a mountain, around 100 strong. This rebel army was easily terminated, and the bodies of the dead were thrown into a river, unburied. More rebellions occurred, including by Buddhist priests. Choe was not able to completely silence the Buddhists, but he did capture the individual Buddhists that were behind a plot to assassinate him.

During this time, various northern tribes, including the Khitan, were being driven from their homelands by the Mongols. Many escaped to Goryeo, and violence flared along the northern border. Choe's sons, U and Hyang, led separate campaigns in response. Hyang defeated the minor tribal armies to the east, and U defeated those in the west with the help of General Kim Chwi-ryeo (김취려). These victories were aided by small contingents of the Mongols.

Succession 
Choe had witnessed the downfall of Jeong Jung-bu's regime, which was caused partially by the lack of a strong legitimate heir. Choe's first son, Choe U, was an effective strategist, soldier, and leader. The second son, Choe Hyang, was an exceptional soldier, but not a very good negotiator or statesman.

Knowing a succession fight would ensue, Choe he forbade U to enter the house. Hyang attempted to kill his brother to cement his position as a successor. U and Hyang fought a sword battle, which U won. U did not kill his brother as his father had done to Chung-Su. Instead, he left the fate of his younger brother in the hands of his father.

Choe Chung-heon was pleased by U's decision and sent his younger son into exile. Choe announced that he would be succeeded by his son, Woo and that he would retire. He was around 65 years old when he made this announcement, and U was probably in his mid-thirties.

Death 
Choe lived peacefully for the remaining seven years of his life, and even got to see his grandson Hang, son of U. Choe did regret some of the decisions he made earlier in life, and also realized that he had fallen into the power-craze that he had sworn not to fall into. Choe survived several attempts on his life. He suffered a stroke, and lived for one more year before he died at the age of 71, on 29 October 1219. It is recorded that his funeral was like that of a king's.

Legacy 
Choe Chung-heon was the first of the Choe dictators, and he set up the system of rule that the later Choe dictators would use. After Choe Chung-Heon was his first son Choe U, who directly led the armies of Goryeo to fight the Mongol armies. After Choe U came his first son Choe Hang, who forced the king to reject all offers of surrender that the Mongols offered. When Choe-Hang died, his only son Choe Ui came to power.

Choe Ui was described as cowardly and obese. The Choe regime ended when Choe Ui was assassinated by one of his lieutenants. Other accounts claim that some troops were trying to push the heavy tyrant over the wall, but were killed before they could do so because he was so fat. Choe Chung-Heon, Choe-U, and Choe-Hang were all trained in the arts, but Choe-Ui did not. This is probably because by then, the Choe family was very wealthy, and no fighting on the battlefields was necessary.

The Choe regime lasted 60 years, during which Goryeo was able to resist the Mongol invasions. After the fall of the Choe military regime, the Sambyeolcho, which was the private army of the Choe family, separated from the Goryeo government and attempted to start its own nation, but this rebellion was defeated by a Mongol-Goryeo army.

Approximately 845 Koreans today are members of the Choe clan of Ubong.

Family
Father: Choe Won-ho (최원호)
Mother: Lady Yu (부인 유씨)
Brother: Choe Chung-su (1151 - 1197) (최충수)
Sister: Lady Choe (부인 최씨)
Nephew: Park Jin-jae (1165 - 1207) (박진재)
Wives and their issue(s):
Lady Song (부인 송씨); daughter of Song Cheong (송청).
Choe U (1166 - 10 December 1249), first son
Choe Hyang (1167 - 1230), second son
Lady Choe (부인 최씨), first daughter
Princess Jeonghwa of the Kaesong Wang clan, daughter of King Gangjong of Goryeo.
Choe Gu (최구), third son
Mr. Choe (최씨), fourth son
Princess Suseong of the Jangheung Im clan (수성택주 임씨); daughter of Im-Bu (임부).
Choe Seong (최성), fifth son
Ja Un-seon (자운선)

Title
Early title: 別抄都令 -> 攝將軍
1196: The title of 左承宣 御史臺知事 was added.
1197: The title of 靖國功臣 三韓大匡大中大夫 上將軍柱國 was added.
1204: The title of 壁上三韓三重大匡 開府儀同三司守太師 門下侍郞同中書門下平章事 上將軍上柱國 兵部御史臺判事 太子太師 was added. Just few days later 晋康郡候 門下侍中 was additionally added.
1212: The title of 晋康府候 文經武緯嚮理措安功臣 was added.

Popular culture
 Portrayed by Kim Kap-soo and Ryu Deok-hwan in the 2003-2004 KBS1 TV series Age of Warriors.
 Portrayed by Joo Hyun in the 2012 MBC TV series God of War.

See also
History of Korea
List of Goryeo people

|-

References

Print
 S. 70-82

Notes

12th-century Korean people
Goryeo Buddhists
Korean generals
Choe clan of Ubong
1149 births
1219 deaths
Leaders who took power by coup
Regents of Korea
13th-century Korean people
Fratricides